Manmohan Technical University is the first technical University in Nepal, founded by Province 1 Government of Nepal.

The first and current Vice Chancellor is Dr. Subash Shree Pokhrel.

Manmohan Technical University is the first technical university in Nepal, founded by Province 1 Government of Nepal. Manmohan Memorial Polytechnic with well facilitated labs, workshops, classrooms and all infrastructure was overtaken by Province 1 Government of Nepal and transformed into a Technical University. Different from other universities in Nepal, it focuses on producing technical manpower in the field of Engineering, Pharmacy, Agriculture, Forestry, Nursing etc. from zeroth level to the highest level. Under the Province 1 government, the Board of Governers will manage the University. This university aims to open and run constituent colleges through out the province 1 of Nepal. 
This university is situated in Budhiganga Rural Municipality of Morang district in Province 1 of Nepal.

References

External links 
Universities in Nepal
2019 establishments in Nepal
Educational institutions established in 2019
Koshi Province

Official website